The Orphan Muses is a Canadian drama film, directed by Robert Favreau and released in 2000. An adaptation of the play by Michel Marc Bouchard, the film stars Marina Orsini, Céline Bonnier, Stéphane Demers and Fanny Mallette as a group of adult siblings dealing with the revelation of a longtime family secret.

The Tanguay siblings grew up as orphans, after their father died and their mother (Louise Portal) ran off with her new lover. Although older siblings Catherine (Orsini), Martine (Bonnier) and Luc (Demers) knew the truth, they conspired to protect their emotionally fragile youngest sister Isabelle (Mallette) by telling her that their mother was dead as well. The film's plot centres on the fallout within the family of the now adult but still emotionally immature Isabelle finally learning the truth that their mother is still alive and simply abandoned them.

Cast
 Marina Orsini as Catherine Tanguay
 Céline Bonnier as Martine Tanguay
 Fanny Mallette as Isabelle Tanguay
 Stéphane Demers as Luc Tanguay
 Louise Portal as Jacqueline Tanguay
 Patrick Labbé as Rémi
 Eric Hoziel		
 Paul Dion		
 Raymond Legault	
 Louise Proulx
 Gilles Cloutier
 Nathalie Claude

Reception
The film received four Genie Award nominations at the 21st Genie Awards in 2000: Best Supporting Actress (Bonnier), 
Best Director (Favreau), Best Screenplay (Bouchard and Gilles Desjardins) and Best Editing (Hélène Girard). At the 3rd Jutra Awards in 2001, the film was nominated for Best Picture, Best Actress (Mallette), Best Director (Favreau), Best Sound, Best Editing and Best Original Music. It won the Jutra for Best Original Music.

References

External links 
 

2000 films
Canadian drama films
Films directed by Robert Favreau
Films based on Canadian plays
2000s French-language films
French-language Canadian films
2000s Canadian films